Games for Schoolchildren or Well, Come On, Smile; is a 1985 Soviet Estonian drama film directed by Arvo Iho and Leida Laius. The film was loosely based on the 1963 short story Kasuema (Stepmother) by Estonian author Silvia Rannamaa.

Plot 
After the death of her mother, high school student Mari ends up in an orphanage. Three days later, the girl returns home, but her drunken father makes it clear almost from the door that she doesn't belong here.

The night spent at the train station ends for Mari with an acquaintance with an aggressive group of teenagers, led by Robi, and being driven to the police. In the morning, the fugitive leaves the cell: the orphanage teacher came for her.

The orphanage has its own internal hierarchy. The dashing guy Robi is considered the informal leader. The guys obey him and readily obey. The polite, intelligent Tauri, who, unlike the other pupils, has a respectable and very busy father, takes custody of the newcomer. Among the girls, the harsh, nervous Katrin, who ended up in an orphanage after her mother was imprisoned, dominates.

Cast 
 Monika Järv as Mari Lehiste
 Hendrik Toompere Jr. as Robi
 Tauri Tallermaa as Tauri
 Katrin Tampleht as Katrin
 Kerttu Aaving as Kerttu
 Edith Helen Tuusk as Melita
 Siiri Sisask as Siiri
 Janika Kalmus as Anne
 Helle Kuningas as Nursery teacher
 Mari Lill as Robi's mother
 Evald Hermaküla as Ülo, Mari's father 
 Eduard Tinn as Tauri's father
 Rudolf Allabert as Director of the orphanage
 Rein Pakk as Rein 
 Maria Klenskaja as Ülo's lover
 Evald Aavik as Teacher

Awards and nominations 
 All-Union Film Festival (1986)
Grand Prize
Best Screenplay (Marina Sheptunova)
 International Film Festival of Young Filmmakers of Socialist Countries in Koszalin (1986) — Polish Film Critics Prize named after Wisniewski (Arvo Iho)
 USSR State Prize for 1987 (director and cameraman Arvo Iho, screenwriter Marina Sheptunova)
 Berlin International Film Festival (1987) — participation in the "Kinderfilmfest" program, prize of the United Nations Children's Fund

References

External links 
 

1985 films
Estonian-language films
Estonian drama films
Soviet-era Estonian films
1985 drama films
Soviet teen films
Films directed by Arvo Iho